The Mehmandarovs are noble family of Azerbaijan.

It may refer to the following people

Karim bey Mehmandarov (1854-1929) — Physician. One of the first Azerbaijani therapeutist and surgeon. First Azerbaijani therapeutist and surgeon graduated from St. Petersburg Medical-Surgical Academy.
Samad bey Mehmandarov (1855-1931)  — General of the artillery in the Imperial Russian Army. Minister of Defense of Azerbaijan Democratic Republic.
Gulnara Mehmandarova (born in 1959) — Architect and researcher. First President of ICOMOS Azerbaijan. She has a PhD in theory and history of architecture and restoration of architectural monuments.

Azerbaijani nobility
Azerbaijani noble families